Joyas Prestadas: Pop and Joyas Prestadas: Banda  (Borrowed Jewels) are the 12th and final  studio albums by recording artist Jenni Rivera, released on  November 21, 2011 by Fonovisa Records. Joyas Prestadas consists of  a double album with eleven cover songs, each recorded with two distinct styles of music. The first half being recorded in pop, while the second was recorded in the Regional Mexican subgenre of banda. The album was produced by Enrique Martinez. According to Rivera, the songs she chose to cover were those she was enamored with while working as a cashier in a record store.

Joyas Prestadas: Pop reached number one on the Mexican Albums Chart and number one on the Billboard Top Latin Albums chart in the United States while Joyas Prestadas: Banda peaked at number three on the Mexican Albums Chart and number two on the Billboard Top Latin Albums chart. Three singles were released from the album: "¡Basta Ya!", "A Cambio de Qué", and "Detrás de Mi Ventana". David Jeffries of Allmusic gave the album a positive review and called the productions "polished".

Joyas Prestadas: Pop received a Lo Nuestro award for Pop Album of the Year and Billboard Latin Music Award nomination for Latin Pop Album of the Year and a nomination for Pop Album of the Year by a Female Artist at the 2013 Oye! Awards. Joyas Prestadas: Banda was awarded two Oye! awards for Banda Albums of the Year and Popular Album of the Year and a Billboard Latin Music Award nomination for Regional Mexican Album of the Year.

Background 
On August 23, 2011, Jenni Rivera renewed her contract with Universal Music Latin Entertainment/Fonovisa Records. To celebrate this event, she performed at the Staples Center in Los Angeles, California, becoming the first female Regional Mexican singer to do so.  Rivera also announced she would be recording two albums in pop and banda titled Joyas Prestadas. The album was her first production to include ballads in a recording.

Recording and covers 

Joyas Prestadas is a double album consisted of eleven tracks originally performed by other singers. Rivera recorded these songs on two versions: pop and banda. According to her, the songs she chose were recordings she listened to while working as a record store cashier. The albums were produced by Enrique Martinez and were recorded at the Twin Recording Studio in Burbank, California. A deluxe version of Joyas Prestadas: Pop was released on August 28, 2012 which contains a DVD of her performing the album live at the Teatro de la Ciudad in Mexico City, Mexico.

The first track, "A Cambio de Qué", was first recorded by Mexican singer Marisela on her album Completamente Tuya (1985). The second track, "A Que no le Cuentas", was first performed by Puerto Rican singer Ednita Nazario on her album, Ednita (1982). "Así Fue" and "Resulta" were both composed by Mexican singer-songwriter Juan Gabriel and originally performed by Isabel Pantoja and Lucha Villa respectively. Rivera also covers Pantoja's song, "Porque Me Gusta a Morir". "¡Basta Ya" and "Como Tu Mujer" were composed by Mexican singer-songwriter Marco Antonio Solís and first performed by Olga Tañón and Rocío Dúrcal. Rivera had previously collaborated with Tañón with their cover of "Cosas del Amor" on the latter's album Exitos en 2 Tiempos (2007). Solís himself appears on both tracks.

The sixth track, "Detrás de Mi Ventana", was written by Ricardo Arjona in 1993 and included in Nueva era (1993), a studio album by Mexican singer Yuri, who performed the song for the first time. Melina Leon also performed the song for Arjona in his compilation album Trópico, released in 2009. "Lo Siento Mi Amor" and "Señora" are covers of Rocío Jurado's songs. "Que Ganas de No Verte Más" was first performed by Argentine singer Valeria Lynch.

Promotion
Jenni Rivera performed the pop version of "¡Basta Ya!" live at La Voz... México on November 27, 2011. Four months later at the end of Yuri's concert at the National Auditorium, Rivera was invited to sing with her. After which Rivera took over the concert and performed ballads from the album as well as songs from her career. At the 19th Latin Billboard Awards ceremony, Rivera performed the pop versions of "Como Tu Mujer" and "Asi Fue". The tour for the album officially began on May 18, 2012 where she performed throughout concerts Mexico and the United States. It abruptly ended on December 9, 2012 after her concert in the Monterrey Arena when a plane carrying her and five other members crashed near Near Iturbide, Nuevo León killing her and everyone else on board.

Commercial performance

Album
In Mexico, Joyas Prestadas: Pop peaked at number one on the Top 100 Mexico albums chart while Joyas Prestadas: Banda peaked at number three on the Top 100 Mexico albums chart. Joyas Prestadas: Pop was certified quadruple platinum and gold by AMPROFON for shipping 270,000 copies in the country while Joyas Prestadas: Banda was certified triple platinum by AMPROFON for shipping 180,000 copies. In the United States, Joyas Prestadas: Pop peaked at number one on the Billboard Top Latin Albums and number one on the Billboard Latin Pop Albums charts. Similarly, Joyas Prestadas: Banda peaked at number two on the Top Latin Albums chart and number one on the Billboard Regional Mexican Albums chart. Within the week of her death, sales for both albums soared in the United States selling over 2,000 copies. Both albums were certified double platinum (Latin field) by the Recording Industry Association of America (RIAA) for shipments of 200,000 copies. Joyas Prestadas: Pop was the best-selling Latin pop album of 2013 in the United States. As of December 2013, both albums have sold over 300,000 copies combined.

Singles

Both versions of "¡Basta Ya!" were released as the lead single from the album on August 29, 2011. In the United States, the song peaked at number fourteen on the Billboard Hot Latin Songs chart and number six on the Billboard Regional Mexican Songs chart. In Mexico, the song reached number one the Monitor Latino charts and number three on the Billboard Mexican Airplay chart. A music video was released for the pop version of the song which was directed by Ricardo Moreno and filmed in Los Angeles, California. "A Cambio de Qué" was the second single to be released from the album on February 28, 2012. In the United States, the song peaked at number forty-nine on the Hot Latin Songs chart and at number twenty-one on the Regional Mexican Songs chart. In Mexico, the song peaked at number twenty-one on the Mexican Airplay chart. "Detrás de Mi Ventana" was the final single released from the album on July 3, 2012. The song peaked at number sixteen on the Hot Latin Songs chart and number six on the Regional Mexican Songs chart.

Reception

David Jeffries of Allmusic gave the album a 3.5 of 5 stars and called the productions for both album "polished". At the 2012 Juventud Awards, the album received a nomination for Best Music Album. At the second Billboard Mexican Music Awards in 2012, Joyas Prestadas: Banda received an award for Banda Album of the Year and a nomination for Album of the Year.  At the 25th Lo Nuestro Awards in 2013, Rivera was posthumously awarded Pop Female Artist of the Year, Pop Album of the Year for Joyas Prestadas: Pop and Pop Song of the Year for her cover of "A Cambio de Qué". A tribute to Rivera was made during the ceremony.

At the 2013 Latin Billboard Awards, Joyas Prestadas: Pop was awarded Album of the Year by a Female Artist while both albums were nominated Latin Pop Album of the Year and Regional Mexican Album of the Year. At the 2013 Mexican Oye! Awards, Joyas Prestadas: Banda was recognized Popular Album of the Year and Banda Album of the Year by a Soloist or Group, while Joyas Prestadas: Pop was nominated Pop Album of the Year by a Female Artist. Joyas Prestadas: Banda was nominated Album of the Year and Banda Album of the Year at the third Billboard Mexican Music Awards. Joyas Prestadas: Pop was nominated Top Latin Album of the Year and Latin Pop Album of the Year at the 2014 Billboard Latin Music Awards.

Track listing

Credits and personnel 
The following credits are from Allmusic:

 Federico Ramos - acoustic and electric guitars
 Peggy Baldwin - cello
 Oscar Benavides - chorus
 Robert Bernstein - dobro, pedal steel
 Jorge Brauet - saxophone, soloist
 Alan Busteed - violin
 Mark Cargill -  violin
 Juan Pablo Castillo - coros
 Susan Chapman - violin
 Rebecca Chung - violin
 Gustavo Farias - Fender Rhodes, Hammond B3
 Paula Fehrenbach - cello
 Martín Flores- drums
 Alfredo "Pollo" Fuentes - mixing
 Nicole Garcia - violin
 Ilona Geller - viola
 Terry Glenny - violin
 Paul Grundman - mastering
 Rob Hardt - saxophone
 Juan Manuel Cortez - conductor
 Pablo Hopenhaya - violin
 Ami Levy - violin
 Enrique Martinez -  arrangements, chorus, director, Fender Rhodes
 Sylvana Martínez - chorus
 Neli Nikolaeva - violin
 Boryana Popova - violin
 Shelly Ren - violin
 Jenni Rivera - vocals (main), primary artist
 Kathleen Robertson - violin
 Carlos Rodgarman - synthesizer
 Javier Rodriguez - flugelhorn
 Kathleen Sloan- violin
 Jean Smit - mixing
 Arturo Solar - conductor, flugelhorn, soloist
 Marco Antonio Solís - guest vocals ("¡Basta Ya!", "Como Tu Mujer")
 Marisa Ann Sorajja - violin
 Allison Speith - viola
 Jenny Takamatsu - violin
 Jonathan Thomson - cello
 Francisco Torres - trombone
 Ina Veli - violin
 Javier Vergara - sax (alto), sax (tenor)
 Dynell Weber - violin
 Dorthy Won - violin
 Chris Woods - viola
 Alwyn Wright - violin
 Nick Yee - viola
 Amanda Zidow - cello
 Ito Serrano – guitar
 Charlie Sierra – percussion, bongos, timbales
 William Thompson – conga
 Maximo Torres – guitar, requinto
 Raffi Torres – trombone
 Yanira Torres – vocals, coro

Charts

Weekly charts 

Joyas Prestadas: Pop

Joyas Prestadas: Banda

Year-end charts

Joyas Prestadas: Pop 

Joyas Prestadas: Banda

Certifications

Joyas Prestadas: Pop

Joyas Prestadas: Banda

Release history

See also
2011 in Latin music
List of number-one albums of 2013 (Mexico)
List of number-one Billboard Latin Albums from the 2010s
List of number-one Billboard Latin Pop Albums from the 2010s

References

2011 albums
2011 video albums
Covers albums
Jenni Rivera albums
Jenni Rivera video albums
Fonovisa Records albums
Fonovisa Records video albums
Spanish-language albums
Spanish-language video albums